Aimée, often unaccented as Aimee, is a feminine given name of French origin, translated as "beloved". The masculine form is Aimé. The English equivalent is Amy. It is also occasionally a surname. It may refer to:

Given name Aimée
 Aimée Bologne-Lemaire (1904–1998), Belgian feminist, member of the resistance and Walloon activist
 Aimée Antoinette Camus (1879–1965), French author
 Aimée Castle (born 1978), Canadian actress
 Aimée Dalmores (1890–1920), Italian-born American actress
 Aimée Delamain (1906–1999), English actress
 Aimée du Buc de Rivéry (1776–1817), French heiress, a cousin of Empress Josephine
 Aimée Duvivier (1766–?), French painter
 Aimée de Heeren (1903–2006), Brazilian socialite
 Aimée de Jongh (born 1988), Dutch cartoonist
 Aimée R. Kreimer (born 1975), American cancer epidemiologist 
 Princess Aimée of Orange-Nassau, van Vollenhoven-Söhngen (born 1977), a princess of the Netherlands by marriage
 Aimée Leduc, a fictional character in crime novels by Cara Black

Given name Aimee 
 Aimee Bender (born 1969), American novelist and short story writer
 Aimee Buchanan (born 1993), American-born Olympic figure skater for Israel
 Aimee Carter (born 1986), American writer
 Aimee Challenor (born 1997), British politician and transgender activist 
 Aimee Chan (born 1981), Canadian born actress based in Hong Kong
 Aimee Anne Duffy (born 1984), Welsh singer-songwriter known professionally as Duffy
 Aimee Echo, American vocalist
 Aimee Carrero (born 1988), American actress
 Aimee Garcia (born 1978), American actress
 Aimee Johnson, American mathematician
 Aimee Mann (born 1960), American rock guitarist, bassist, and singer-songwriter
 Aimee Mullins (born 1976), American amputee athlete
 Aimee Nezhukumatathil (born 1974), Asian-American poet
 Aimee Osbourne (born 1983), English actress and singer, daughter of Ozzy and Sharon Osbourne
 Aimee Phan, American author
 Aimee Semple McPherson (1890–1944), Canadian evangelist and founder of the Foursquare Church
 Aimee Sweet (born 1977), American glamour model and pornographic actress
 Aimee Teegarden (born 1989), American actress
 Aimee Willard (1974–1996), American lacrosse player who was murdered
 Aimee Lou Wood (born 1995), English actress

Surname 
 Anouk Aimée, stage name of French film actress Françoise Florence Dreyfus (born 1932)
 Cyrille Aimée (born 1984), French jazz singer
 Patrick Aimée (born 1976), Mauritian footballer

See also 
 Aimée & Jaguar, a 1999 German drama film set during World War II
 Aurore and Aimée, a French literary fairy tale written by Jeanne-Marie Le Prince de Beaumont
 Amie (disambiguation)

References 

French feminine given names